The 2011 IIHF World Championship Division I was an international ice hockey tournament run by the International Ice Hockey Federation. Group A was contested in Budapest, Hungary, and Group B was contested in Kyiv, Ukraine, with both tournaments running from 17 to 23 April 2011.

Participants

Group A

 Japan withdrew due to many players and players' families being affected by the 2011 Tōhoku earthquake and tsunami. The IIHF decided that the 5th team in Group A would be relegated and Japan would retain their Division I place for the 2012 championship.

Group B

Group A tournament

Standings

Fixtures

All times local.

Scoring leaders
List shows the top skaters sorted by points, then goals.

GP = Games played; G = Goals; A = Assists; Pts = Points; +/− = Plus/minus; PIM = Penalties in minutes; POS = PositionSource: IIHF.com

Leading goaltenders
Only the top five goaltenders, based on save percentage, who have played 40% of their team's minutes are included in this list.
TOI = Time on ice (minutes:seconds); SA = Shots against; GA = Goals against; GAA = Goals against average; Sv% = Save percentage; SO = ShutoutsSource: IIHF.com

Tournament awards
 Best players selected by the directorate  
Best Goaltender: 
Best Forward: 
Best Defenseman:

Group B tournament

Standings

Fixtures

All times local.

Scoring leaders
List shows the top skaters sorted by points, then goals.

GP = Games played; G = Goals; A = Assists; Pts = Points; +/− = Plus/minus; PIM = Penalties in minutes; POS = PositionSource: IIHF.com

Leading goaltenders
Only the top five goaltenders, based on save percentage, who have played 40% of their team's minutes are included in this list.
TOI = Time on ice (minutes:seconds); SA = Shots against; GA = Goals against; GAA = Goals against average; Sv% = Save percentage; SO = ShutoutsSource: IIHF.com

Tournament awards
 Best players selected by the directorate  
Best Goaltender: 
Best Forward: 
Best Defenseman:

IIHF broadcasting rights

References

IIHF World Championship Division I
2
2011 IIHF World Championship Division I
2011 IIHF World Championship Division I
IIHF
IIHF